Bilici Qorqan (also, Bilici-Qorğan) is a village in the municipality of Qorqan in the Davachi Rayon of Azerbaijan.

References

Populated places in Shabran District